Jane Edna Hunter (December 13, 1882 – January 13, 1971), an African-American social worker, was born near Pendleton, South Carolina. In 1911 she established the Working Girls Association in Cleveland, Ohio, which later became the Phillis Wheatley Association of Cleveland.

Life

Her parents were wage earners on mainly the Woodburn Plantation Farm working as sharecroppers, but tended to move around plantations trying to find better wages. After her father died in 1892, she did housework for local families. She began school at the age of 14, attending the Ferguson and Williams Academy in Abbeville, South Carolina. She graduated with an eighth-grade education in 1900. She returned to work as a domestic.

She was briefly married to Edward Hunter, who was about 40 years her senior. She moved to Charleston, South Carolina. She began nursing training at the Cannon Street Hospital and Training School for Nurses. In 1904, she completed one year of training at the Hampton Institute in Virginia.

She moved to Cleveland, Ohio, in 1905. In 1911, she founded the Working Girls Association to offer shelter, assistance, and education to women. The Phillis Wheatley Home was opened in 1911 with 23 rooms; Hunter worked with white leaders to expand the size and service of the facility. In 1912, the Phillis Wheatley Home became the Phillis Wheatley Association of Cleveland, named in honor of the African-American poet Phillis Wheatley.

In 1925, Hunter graduated from the Cleveland State University College of Law, which was then affiliated with Baldwin-Wallace College  and was admitted to the Ohio Bar. 

Hunter oversaw the construction of an eleven-story residence for black women, completed in 1927, that had beauty school, dining facilities, a nursery school and the Booker T. Washington playground.

She had invested in Cleveland real estate and was active in the National Association of Colored Women. She also served as a trustee of Ohio's Central State University. In 1937 Hunter was awarded the NAACP's Spingarn Medal for her outstanding achievements within the community.

She wrote an autobiographical book entitled A Nickel and Prayer, which was published in 1940. She served as executive director of the Phillis Wheatley Association of Cleveland until she retired in 1947. 

She held honorary degrees from Allen University, Fisk University, Central State University and Tuskegee Institute. She was on the board of directors and was a vice president of the National Association for the Advancement of Colored People.

Her health failed in the mid-1950s. She lived  in a nursing home from the early 1960s until her death on January 13, 1971, in Cleveland.

Legacy
The Cuyahoga County Department of Children and Family Services Agency named its principal building the Jane Edna Hunter Social Services Center to honor her work with children and families. The Jane Edna Hunter Museum is at the Phillis Wheatley Center in Cleveland.

Jane Edna Hunter: a case study of Black leadership is a book about her life. Jane Edna Hunter was born Jane Harris in 1882. She was a fair complexion woman, because her father was born to a slave and a Caucasian overseer. As a young girl growing up Hunter felt that her lighter complexion made her greater than her dark skin mother, family friends, and friends. It was not until her teenage years that Hunter started to embrace who she was as a black woman. After receiving training as a nurse at several nursing schools, Hunter moved to Cleveland Ohio, where she was confronted with racism, in not being able to find a job in nursing, or housing accommodation at the local YWCA. The YWCA, like many other foundations, was refusing to house Negro women migrating from the South. Jane Edna Hunter decided to try to convince the white woman who was running the YWCA to establish a separate foundation for black women. However many of the older Negro women were opposed, feeling that Hunter was starting self-segregation, which then prompted Jane Edna Hunter "with a nickel and a prayer" to establish the Phillis Wheatley Association. That functioned as an employment agency and a summer camp to help elevate African-American women and children.

References

Further reading
 Hunter, Jane Edna. ''A Nickel and a Prayer. (1941, 2011). Ed. Rhondda R. Thomas. Regenerations Series. Morgantown: West Virginia University Press.''
 The Jane Edna Hunter Project. (2012). Clemson University.
 Thomas, Rhondda R. & Ashton, Susanna, eds. (2014). The South Carolina Roots of African American Thought. Columbia: University of South Carolina Press. "Jane Edna Harris Hunter (1882–1971)," pp. 195–199.

Baldwin Wallace University alumni
Cleveland–Marshall College of Law alumni
1882 births
1971 deaths